Birch River Wildland Provincial Park is a wildland provincial park located in Wood Buffalo, northern Alberta, Canada. The park borders Wood Buffalo National Park to the north, Kitaskino Nuwenëné Wildland Provincial Park to the east, and has a short southern border with Birch Mountains Wildland Provincial Park.

Ecology
The park is in the Kazan Region of the Canadian Shield and part of the Boreal forest. The park is home to 68 species of concern including three that are listed under the Canadian Species at Risk Act such as the peregrine falcon, wood bison, and boreal woodland caribou. The park contains 13 per cent of the core habitat for the Red Earth caribou range.

Activities
Human activity is significantly limited within the park. The park is remote, and access is only available via aircraft with prior authorization. Backcountry hiking and random backcountry camping are permitted; there are no developed campsites. Hunting and fishing are allowed with special permits.

See also
List of provincial parks in Alberta
List of Canadian provincial parks
List of national parks of Canada

References

External links
 
 
 
 
 
 

Parks in Alberta
Regional Municipality of Wood Buffalo
Mountain ranges of Alberta